Tertanga is a hamlet and council located in the municipality of Amurrio, in Álava province, Basque Country, Spain. As of 2020, it has a population of 84.

Geography 
Tertanga is located 40 km west-northwest of Vitoria-Gasteiz.

References

Populated places in Álava